Crab Lake may refer to:

Crab Lake, Minnesota, an unorganized territory
Crab Lake (St. Louis County, Minnesota), a lake